Yaacov Ben-Dov (21 June 1882 – 7 March 1968) was an Israeli photographer and a pioneer of Jewish cinematography in Palestine.

Biography
Ya'acov Ben-Dov was born in a shtetl near Kiev in Ukraine, son of Dov and Raizel Lasutra. He studied religious studies in a heder and secular subjects with private tutors. In his mid teens, he joined a movement devoted to reviving the Hebrew language. He attended the Academy of the Arts in Kiev and became a professional photographer. A skeptical Menachem Ussishkin is said to have asked Ben Dov what need he thinks Jerusalem has for a photographer, to which Ben Dov answered "I need Jerusalem more than Jerusalem needs a photographer."

Ben Dov arrived in Eretz Yisrael in 1907 as part of the Second Aliyah and attended the Bezalel Academy of Arts and Design where he continued his studies and later taught photography. In 1909, he married Roza Rabinowitz, a pharmacist, who immigrated from Zhytomir, Ukraine. In 1922, he was one of the founders of the Jerusalem neighborhood of Talpiot.

Ben-Dov first encountered film in 1911 when British Zionist Murray Rosenberg filmed his visit and visited Bezalel Academy. He was enchanted but it took him several years to obtain a camera and raw film stock. At the outbreak of World War I, he joined the Ottoman Imperial Army and obtained a commission as a medical photographer in the Austrian army in Jerusalem. In 1917, he finally acquired the equipment he needed probably through his Austrian military connections.

Filmography

Ben-Dov established the Menorah Film Company and became the sole cameraman filming key historical events. His first film, Judea Liberated documents General Edmund Allenby's historic entry into Jerusalem on 11 December 1917. Just a month earlier, the Balfour Declaration, expressing British support for a Jewish state in Palestine, was issued. And thus, Allenby's entry was enthusiastically received. In addition, Ben-Dov photographed Hanukkah festivities in Jerusalem schools, craftsmen working in workshops, public gatherings, etc. under the title Mirror of the Return to Zion. After the production of this film, he received some financial support from the official Zionist bodies who now recognized the value of his work.

Ben-Dov immortalized images of the Jewish Legion in Eretz Israel in his second film Land of Israel Liberated (1919), which includes a portrait of Legion founder Ze'ev Jabotinsky in uniform. In February 1915, a small committee in Alexandria approved Ze'ev Jabotinsky and Joseph Trumpeldor’s plan to form a Jewish military unit that would participate in the British effort to conquer the Land of Israel from the Ottoman Empire. Instead a Zion Mule Corps unit of 560 soldiers was formed fighting in the Gallipoli Campaign in Turkey. After the dissolution of the Mule Corps, a number of veterans, Jewish soldiers from abroad and fresh recruits from Eretz Israel eventually formed an official Jewish regiment called the Jewish Legion in August 1917 seeing action north of Jerusalem, in the Jordan River and in the Battle of Megiddo (1918). In addition to the fragments of the Jewish Legion, the Steven Spielberg Jewish Film Archive holds one reel showing Jewish communities in north of the country including Merhavia, Sejera, Degania, Rosh Pinna, Safed, Migdal and Metula.
 
Ben-Dov shot some of the earliest footage of an archaeological expedition, the excavation of the Hammat Tiberias Synagogue, in 1920. The footage was used in his film Shivat Zion (Return to Zion). The film was screened at the 12th Zionist Congress in Carlsblad.

In 1923, he produced Palestine Awakening, the first film to be shot exclusively for the Jewish National Fund. It is also the first Hebrew film using actors and containing dialogue.

Yaacov Ben-Dov photographed key events in the life of the yishuv, such as the wedding of Rachel Ussishkin to Shimon Fritz Bodenheimer, the arrival of the first British Commissioner to Palestine Herbert Samuel, the funeral of Eliezer Ben-Yehuda and the opening of the Hebrew University of Jerusalem.

Baruch Agadati purchased Ben Dov's film archives in 1934, when Ben Dov retired from filmmaking owing to his inability to adapt to sound. Agadati and his brother Yitzhak used it to start the AGA Newsreel.

Films

Awards and recognition
 Worthy Citizen of Jerusalem

See also
Cinema of Israel
Photographers active in Ottoman and Mandate Palestine 1900-1948
Najib Anton Albina (1901–1983), master photographer of the Palestine Archaeological Museum
American Colony, Jerusalem#Photography: see for its Photographic Department, later Matson Photographic Service, active c. 1900-1940s
Armenians in Israel#Photographers: see for Armenian photographers in Jerusalem since 1857
Ze'ev (Wilhelm) Aleksandrowicz (1905-1992), Polish-born photographer, active in Mandate Palestine between 1932 and 1935
Zoltan Kluger (1896-1977), important photographer in pre-state Israel
Khalil Raad (1854–1957), known as "Palestine's first Arab photographer"
Samuel Joseph Schweig (1905–1985), landscape and archaeology photographer in Mandate Palestine and early Israel
 :de:Herbert Sonnenfeld (1906-1972), German Jewish photographer, husband of Leni, photographed in Mandate Palestine in the 1930s
 Leni Sonnenfeld (1907-2004), German Jewish photographer, wife of Herbert, photographed Israel in the early years of its existence
Rudi Weissenstein (1910-1999), Israeli photographer, author of iconic Declaration of Independence picture

References

External links

 Films about and by Yaacov Ben Dov in the Steven Spielberg Jewish Film Archive:
Yaacov Ben Dov: Father of the Hebrew Film
Land of Israel Liberated
Banim Bonim
Springtime in Palestine
 Galleria, Haaretz, 11.01.2011 (in He.)
 Culture and Literature, Haaretz, 30.07.2010 (in He.)
Culture and Literature, Haaretz, 11.01.2011 (in He.)
 
 
 .

Early photographers in Palestine
Israeli film directors
Bezalel Academy of Arts and Design alumni
Burials at the Jewish cemetery on the Mount of Olives
Israeli photographers
Emigrants from the Russian Empire to the Ottoman Empire
1882 births
1968 deaths